Heydarkhani may refer to:

Heydarkhani, Kerman
Heydarkhani, Lorestan